General elections were held in Saint Lucia on 12 October 1951. The result was a victory for the Saint Lucia Labour Party, which won five of the eight seats. Voter turnout was 59.1%.

Results

References

Saint Lucia
Elections in Saint Lucia
1951 in Saint Lucia
British Windward Islands
October 1951 events in North America